List of presidents of the National Assembly of Burundi. The president is the presiding officer in the National Assembly of Burundi.

This is a list of presidents (speakers) of the Constituent Assembly of Burundi:

This is a list of presidents (speakers) of the National Assembly of Burundi:

Sources

Politics of Burundi
Burundi
 
Presidents of the National Assembly